The Cessna A-37 Dragonfly, or Super Tweet, is an American light attack aircraft developed from the T-37 Tweet basic trainer in the 1960s and 1970s by Cessna of Wichita, Kansas. The A-37 was introduced during the Vietnam War and remained in peacetime service afterward.

Design and development
The growing American military involvement in Vietnam in the early 1960s led to strong interest in counter-insurgency (COIN) aircraft. In late 1962, the U.S. Air Force's Special Air Warfare Center at Eglin Air Force Base's Hurlburt Field in Florida evaluated two T-37Cs for the role.

The Air Force found the T-37 promising, but wanted an improved version of the aircraft that could carry a much larger payload, and had much greater endurance and better short-field performance. This meant a heavier aircraft with more powerful engines. In 1963, the Air Force awarded a contract to Cessna for two prototype YAT-37D aircraft: T-37s with modifications that included:

Stronger wings.
Three stores pylons on each wing.
Larger wingtip fuel tanks of  capacity.
A General Electric GAU-2B/A  "Minigun" Gatling-style machine gun, with a rate of fire of 3,000 rounds/minute and 1,500 rounds of ammunition. The weapon was fitted in the right side of the aircraft's nose behind a large, convenient access panel. A gunsight and gun camera were also fitted.
Better avionics for battlefield communications, navigation, and targeting.
Tougher landing gear for rough-field operation.

These changes meant a drastic increase in aircraft weight and the aircraft now had to carry a significant payload as well. Cessna, therefore, doubled the engine power by replacing the two Continental J-69 engines with General Electric J85-J2/5 turbojet engines with  thrust each.

The first YAT-37D flew in October 1964, followed a year later by the second prototype. The second prototype had four stores pylons under each wing, rather than three, and the first prototype was upgraded to this configuration as well.

Test results were good, but USAF interest in counter-insurgency (COIN) aircraft had faded for the moment. The program went into limbo for a time, with the second prototype "put out to pasture" at the National Museum of the United States Air Force at Wright-Patterson Air Force Base in Ohio.

The war in Southeast Asia, however, continued to escalate. Losses of Douglas A-1 Skyraider close-support aircraft in USAF, United States Navy, and Republic of Vietnam Air Force service proved greater than anticipated and USAF interest in COIN aircraft was revived. The YAT-37D seemed like a promising candidate for the job, but the Air Force felt that the only way to be sure was to evaluate the aircraft in combat.

As a result, the USAF issued a contract to Cessna for a pre-production batch of 39 YAT-37Ds, with a few minor changes relative to the prototypes, to be rebuilt from existing T-37Bs. These aircraft were initially designated AT-37D, but the designation was quickly changed to A-37A. The second prototype YAT-37D was pulled out of the Air Force Museum and upgraded to A-37A standards as part of the test program.

The A-37A retained the dual controls of its T-37B ancestor, allowing it to be used as an operational trainer.

In combat "forward air control (FAC)" operations, the second seat was occupied by an observer. Only one crewman normally flew in the aircraft for close support missions, permitting a slight increase in ordnance.

Operational history

Vietnam War
In August 1967, 25 A-37As were sent to Vietnam under the "Combat Dragon" evaluation program, and flew from Bien Hoa Air Base on USAF "air commando" missions, including close air support, helicopter escort, FAC, and night interdiction. Combat loads included high-explosive bombs, cluster munition dispensers, unguided rocket packs, napalm tanks, and the SUU-11/A Minigun pod. For most missions, the aircraft also carried two additional external fuel tanks on the inner stores pylons.

During this period, the A-37As flew thousands of sorties. None were lost to enemy fire, although two were wrecked in landing accidents. The A-37A was formally named the "Dragonfly", but most pilots called it the "Super Tweet". The Combat Dragon program was successful, but unsurprisingly the combat evaluation revealed some of the deficiencies of the A-37A. The most noticeable problem was that the aircraft lacked range and endurance. Other concerns were heavy control response during attack runs (the flight controls were not power-boosted) and the vulnerability of the aircraft's non-redundant flight control system.

The USAF signed a contract with Cessna in early 1967 for an improved Super Tweet, designated the "A-37B". The initial order was for 57 aircraft, but this was quickly increased to 127. The A-37Bs were primarily intended to be supplied to the Republic of Vietnam Air Force (RVNAF) as replacements for their A-1 Skyraiders. The A-37B prototype was rolled out in September 1967, with deliveries to the South Vietnamese beginning in 1968.

The A-37Bs were all newly built airframes. These were stronger than those of the A-37A, capable of pulling 6 g instead of 5, and were built to have a longer fatigue life of 4,000 hours. Field experience would demonstrate that 7,000 hours between overhauls could be tolerated.

The A-37B weighed almost twice as much as the T-37C. A remarkable fraction of the loaded weight, could be external stores. In practice, the A-37B usually operated with at least two and sometimes four underwing fuel tanks to improve combat endurance.

In order to accommodate the increased weight, the A-37B was fitted with General Electric J85-GE-17A engines, providing  thrust each. These engines were canted slightly outward and downward to improve single-engine handling. Air commando pilots in Vietnam operating the A-37A had found single-engine cruise an effective means of improving their flight endurance.

Modifications were made to control surfaces to improve handling. To improve aircraft and crew survivability, the A-37B was fitted with redundant elevator control runs that were placed as far apart as possible. The ejection seats were armored, the cockpit was lined with nylon flak curtains, and foam-filled self-sealing fuel tanks were installed.

The A-37 excelled at close air support. It could engage targets at speeds 100 miles per hour slower than swept-wing fighters.

The A-37B added a refueling probe to the nose, leading to pipes wrapped around the lower lip of the canopy, for probe-and-drogue aerial refueling. This was an unusual fit for USAF aircraft, which traditionally are configured for boom refueling. Other improvements included updated avionics, a redesigned instrument panel to make the aircraft easier to fly from either seat, an automatic engine inlet de-icing system, and revised landing gear. Like its predecessors, the A-37B was not pressurized.

The A-37 required a relatively low amount of maintenance compared to contemporary fighters—only two hours of maintenance for each hour of flight time. This was partially due to multiple access panels in strategic locations.

The  GPU-2/A and AMD  cannon pods were tested with favorable results on the A-37B, but reports indicate that such pods were either seldom or never used in operation.

Post-Vietnam era
A total of 577 A-37Bs were built, with 254 delivered to the RVNAF. At war's end, the A-37 had flown over 160,000 combat sorties with only 22 USAF losses.

When North Vietnamese forces captured Da Nang Air Base, at the end of March 1975, they captured large amounts of stores and equipment, including 33 intact A-37s. On 28 April 1975, several captured A-37s were used by the North Vietnamese to attack Tan Son Nhut Air Base, still held by the South Vietnamese. Approximately 187 A-37Bs were in RVNAF service at the Fall of Saigon in April 1975. Ninety-two were recovered by the US, while the other 95 were later used by the Vietnam People's Air Force in missions over Cambodia and during the China conflict in 1979. These "renegade" aircraft were phased out of service in the late 1970s or early 1980s, likely due to the lack of spares. Some of the aircraft were shipped to Vietnam's then-Communist allies such as Czechoslovakia, Poland, the Soviet Union and East Germany. Others were sold to private foreign owners. Six examples of the A-37B became property of American warbird fans, while four A-37Bs are now privately owned in Australia and New Zealand.

After the war, the USAF passed their A-37Bs from the USAF Tactical Air Command (TAC) to TAC-gained units in the Air National Guard and Air Force Reserve. In the early 1980s these aircraft were assigned to the FAC (Forward Air Control) role and given the designation OA-37B. The OA-37Bs were eventually phased out in the 1980s and 1990s and replaced in the FAC mission by the much more formidable Fairchild Republic A-10 Thunderbolt II in Air Force, Air National Guard and Air Force Reserve service.

OA-37s from the 24th Composite Wing's (later 24th Wing's) 24th Tactical Air Support Squadron (24 TASS) also saw service during Operation Just Cause

Salvadoran Civil War

A-37Bs were used extensively by the Salvadoran Air Force during the Salvadoran Civil War, supplied by the United States in 1983 as a replacement for the Salvadoran Air Force's Dassault Ouragans, several of which had been destroyed on the ground by the FMLN. A-37Bs were used to bomb rebel bases, columns, towns, provided close air support, and flew interdiction missions. A total of 21 A-37Bs and 9 OA-37Bs were supplied during the war, one of which was lost on November 18, 1989 when fire from a Dragunov sniper rifle killed the co-pilot, causing the pilot to eject, and another that was shot down by an SA-7 missile on November 23, 1990.

Nine A-37s remained in operational condition by the end of the war.

Other Latin American countries
The A-37B was also exported to Latin America, mostly during the 1970s. It was well suited to their needs because of its simplicity, low cost, and effectiveness for insurgent warfare. Most of the A-37Bs exported south had the refueling probe shortened to act as a single-point ground refueling probe, or deleted completely.

The Guatemalan Air Force flew the A-37 in extensive counter-insurgency operations throughout the 1970s-1990s, losing one aircraft in action in 1985. It has also been widely used for counter-narcotics operations.

On 20 April 2001, a Peruvian Air Force A-37B Dragonfly shot down a civilian Cessna A185E floatplane with a minigun under surveillance by CIA controllers who advised against engaging. The Peruvian controller had the final authority in this situation, and he believed that the flight was carrying drugs out of the country, and so ordered the A-37 pilot to open fire. As a result a US missionary and her daughter were killed. The Cessna A185E crash landed in a river where locals in their boats helped the passengers.

Variants

YAT-37D
Two former T-37C trainer prototypes converted for counter-insurgency operations with two J-85-GE engines and six underwing pylons as prototypes for the A-37 series, redesignated YA-37A.
YA-37A
Two YAT-37D prototypes redesignated.
A-37A
(Cessna Model 318D) T-37B rebuilt with two J-85-GE-5 engines, a 7.62 mm Minigun in nose and eight underwing stores pylons, 39 conversions.
A-37B
(Cessna Model 318E) Production version with two J-85-GE-17A engines, provision for inflight refuelling, increased fuel capacity and strengthened airframe, 577 built.
OA-37B
The OA-37B Dragonfly was an armed observation aircraft developed during the Vietnam War.

Operators

Current

Colombian Air Force 7 remain in service as of December 2016. They have been modified to carry GBU-12 Paveway II LGBs.

El Salvador Air Force - 15 in service as of December 2016.

Guatemalan Air Force 1 remains in service as of December 2018.

Honduran Air Force 9 operational as of December 2016.

Peruvian Air Force 24 operational as of December 2016. Peru has recently acquired 8 A-37Bs donated by South Korea.

Uruguayan Air Force 12 in service as of December 2016.

Former

Chilean Air Force received 44 aircraft – Retired by the end of 2009, the last two planes in flight were flown back to Santiago-El Bosque AFB on May 27, 2010.

Dominican Air Force

Ecuadorian Air Force received 28 aircraft. Replaced by the Embraer EMB 314 Super Tucano.

South Korean Air Force – First introduced in October 1976, the A-37 was replaced by the T-50 Golden Eagle. It also served with the ROKAF Black Eagles aerobatic team, until retired after the Seoul Air Show in 2007.

Royal Thai Air Force - 16 received in the 1970s, with two more received in the 1980s.

United States Air Force
see List of United States Air Force squadrons operating the A-37 Dragonfly

Republic of Vietnam Air Force - 254 received.

Vietnam Air Force - 95 captured

Aircraft on display

Australia
Airworthy
A-37B Dragonfly
68-10779 - Temora Aviation Museum, civil registered as VH-XVA. Ownership was transferred to the Royal Australian Air Force in July 2019 and it is operated by the Air Force Heritage Squadron (Temora Historic Flight).
68-10805 - Temora Aviation Museum, civil registered as VH-DLO.

Chile
Display
A-37B Dragonfly
FACh 629 - Museo Nacional Aeronáutico y del Espacio in Santiago.

Colombia
Display
A-37B Dragonfly
FAC-2171 (ex-USAF 71-0370) - Museo Militar Colombia in Bogotá, Colombia

New Zealand
Display
A-37B Dragonfly
Classic Flyers Museum in Mount Maunganui; one of the two has been restored to flying condition

Poland
Display
A-37B Dragonfly
Polish Aviation Museum in Kraków donated by Vietnam People's Air Force in 1978 with 2 F-5 (1 F-5A and 1 F-5E) for aeronautical re-engineering projects.

Thailand
Display
A-37B Dragonfly
Royal Thai Air Force Museum in Don Mueang, Bangkok.

United States
Display

YA-37A Dragonfly
62-5951 - National Museum of the United States Air Force at Wright-Patterson Air Force Base in Dayton, Ohio. This aircraft, one of two YAT-37Ds, was retired to the museum in December 1964. In August 1966 it was recalled to active service for final testing of the A-37 design.  The aircraft was retired to the museum for a second time in July 1970 as the YA-37A.
A-37A Dragonfly
67-14525 - Museum of Aviation, Robins AFB, Warner Robins, Georgia.
A-37B Dragonfly
67-14790 - Lackland Static Airplane Display at Lackland Air Force Base in San Antonio, Texas
69-6439 - Stonehenge Air Museum, Fortine, Montana.
71-0790 - March Field Air Museum, Riverside, California.
OA-37B Dragonfly
70-1293 - Memorial Air Park at Hurlburt Field in Florida.

Vietnam
Display
A-37B Dragonfly
67-14529 - Vietnam People's Air Force Museum, Hanoi

Uruguay
Display
A-37B Dragonfly
69-6429 - Colonel Jaime Meregalli Aeronautical Museum, Canelones.

Specifications (A-37B Dragonfly)

See also

References

Notes

Bibliography
 Dorr, Robert F. and Bishop, Chris. Vietnam Air War Debrief. London: Aerospace Publishing, 1996. .
 Cotter, Jarrod. Temora's Dragonflies: The Dragonfly Warbirds of Temora. Air Enthusiast 111, May/June 2004, pp. 2–5. 
 Ford, Daniel. From 'Tweet" to Predator: Portfolio on the T-37 and the Dragonfly . Air Enthusiast, No. 111, May/June 2004, pp. 6–11. 
 Hoyle, Craig. "World Air Forces Directory". Flight International, Vol. 190, No. 5566, 6–12 December 2016, pp. 22–53. . 
 Joiner, Stephen. "Super Tweet". Air & Space, Volume 24, Issue 6, December 2009/January 2010, pp. 42–49.
 Lavalle, A. J. C. (ed.) USAF Southeast Asia Monograph Series Volume III: The Vietnamese Air Force 1951–75. Washington D.C.: Office of Air Force History, 1985. .
 Mesko, Jim. "The Rise...and Fall of the Vietnamese Air Force". Air Enthusiast, Sixteen, August–November 1981. pp. 1–12, 78–80. .
 Michell, Simon. Jane's Civil and Military Aircraft Upgrades 1994–95. Coulsdon, UK: Jane's Information Group, 1994. .
Overall, Mario E. Combat Dragons: Guatemala's Cessna A-37s. Air Enthusiast, No. 111,  May/June 2004, pp. 12–23. .
 Pocock, Chris. "Thailand Hones its Air Forces". Air International, Vol. 31, No. 3, September 1986. pp. 113–121, 168. .

External links

Legends of Vietnam: Super Tweet

A-37
Low-wing aircraft
Twinjets
1960s United States attack aircraft
Cruciform tail aircraft
Aircraft first flown in 1964
Military equipment of the Vietnam War